Lisel Vad Olsson (born 2 June 1981) is a former Danish politician. She has been the leader of the Vegan Party from 15 September 2020 to march 2021, when the former leader Michael Monberg resigned. The party became eligible to run in the next Danish general election only a month prior. Olsson is certified in several types of meditation and healing, including reiki, and has studied both theology and anthropology at Copenhagen University.

References 

1981 births
Living people
People from Copenhagen
Vegan Party politicians
Leaders of political parties in Denmark